Of God and Dogs is a 2014 documentary short film, directed by Abounaddara Collective. Abounaddara Collective is a Damascus based independent film company that specializes in documentaries.

The film later screened at 2014 Sundance Film Festival on January 18, 2014. It won the Grand Jury Prize at the festival. The film later screened at 2014 Sundance London Film Festival on April 26, 2014.

Synopsis
The film narrates the story of a soldier, who had killed an innocent man and now seeks vengeance from God.

Accolades

References

External links
 

2014 films
Syrian documentary films
Sundance Film Festival award winners
Documentary films about war
2014 short documentary films